In mathematical finite group theory, the classical involution theorem of  classifies simple groups with a classical involution and satisfying some other conditions, showing that they are mostly groups of Lie type over a field of odd characteristic.  extended the classical involution theorem to groups of finite Morley rank.

A classical involution t of a finite group G is an involution whose centralizer has a subnormal subgroup containing t with quaternion Sylow 2-subgroups.

References

Theorems about finite groups